Barış Örücü (born 10 May 1992) is a footballer who plays as an attacking midfielder or winger for Sakaryaspor. Born in Germany, he represented that nation at under-18 youth level before being selected for Turkey's 'A2' team.

Career
He made his Süper Lig debut against Manisaspor on 30 October 2011.

Örücü has played for Germany on international level and appeared on five occasions for the German U18, before deciding to represent Turkey.

References

External links
 Barış Örücü at TFF.org
 
 

1992 births
Living people
Sportspeople from Krefeld
Turkish footballers
Turkey B international footballers
German people of Turkish descent
German footballers
Germany youth international footballers
Bayer 04 Leverkusen players
MSV Duisburg players
Bursaspor footballers
Konyaspor footballers
Alanyaspor footballers
Denizlispor footballers
İstanbulspor footballers
Sakaryaspor footballers
Süper Lig players
TFF First League players
Association football midfielders
Association football wingers
Footballers from North Rhine-Westphalia